Martin Taylor (born 1952) is a businessman and former chief executive of Barclays Bank. He is an external member of the Bank of England's Financial Policy Committee.

Career
He joined Reuters as a journalist in 1974, before moving to the Financial Times in 1978, where he edited the paper's "Lex" column.

In 1984, he joined the board of Courtaulds, becoming chief executive of Courtaulds Textiles by 1990.  He became chief executive of Barclays four years later, in 1994, remaining there until 1998. He joined the board at retail chain W H Smith in 1999, eventually becoming chief executive before departing in 2003.

He was a member of the UK Parliament select Committee for Science and Technology for five years.  He also joined the Institute for Public Policy Research (IPPR) and compiled their 2001 Commission on Public/Private Partnerships report.

He has attended many meetings of the Bilderberg Group and served as Secretary General for several years.

Taylor is vice-chairman of the board of RTL Group., and was formerly chairman of Syngenta AG and of the Syngenta Foundation for Sustainable Agriculture. He was an international adviser to Goldman Sachs until 2005.

He was appointed to the Bank of England Financial Policy Committee in March 2013.

Education and life

Taylor was born in Burnley, Lancashire, and educated at Eton and Balliol College, Oxford, where he earned a degree in Oriental languages.

Taylor has two daughters and a son. He is an avid traveller and is interested in art, language, music, literature, and architecture.

References

Further reading
 Bramwell G Rudd COURTAULDS and the HOSIERY & KNITWEAR INDUSTRY (Carnegie Publishing Ltd) (2014, ISBN softback 978-1-905472-06-2, hardback 978-1-905472-18-5)

External links
 Profile at the Syngenta Foundation for Sustainable Agriculture

1952 births
Living people
People from Burnley
People educated at Eton College
Alumni of Balliol College, Oxford
Members of the Steering Committee of the Bilderberg Group